Vasiliy Borisovich Kaptyukh (born June 27, 1967 in Maladzyechna) is a Belarusian former discus thrower who won the Olympic bronze medal in 1996. He has in fact never won gold or silver medals in major competitions, and he finished fourth in major contests such as the 2000 and 2004 Summer Olympics, despite he even setting his personal best throw at the former with 67.59 metres.

His father Boris and his aunt Vera Kaptyukh were also prominent athletes.

He made his first international appearance at the 1985 European Athletics Junior Championships, where he finished third to win the discus bronze medal.

He retired from international athletics in June 2010.

His son, Roman Kaptyukh, was among the victims of the 2011 Minsk Metro bombing.

Achievements

References

External links

Belarusian male discus throwers
1967 births
Living people
People from Maladzyechna
Athletes (track and field) at the 1996 Summer Olympics
Athletes (track and field) at the 2000 Summer Olympics
Athletes (track and field) at the 2004 Summer Olympics
Olympic athletes of Belarus
Olympic bronze medalists for Belarus
World Athletics Championships medalists
Medalists at the 1996 Summer Olympics
Olympic bronze medalists in athletics (track and field)
Sportspeople from Minsk Region